Cincinnati Township is located in Harrison County, Iowa. The population is  220 with 112 males and 108 females.

References

Townships in Harrison County, Iowa
Townships in Iowa